Valencia is third biggest city in Spain and 15th-most populous city in the European Union. Several skyscrapers were built between 2000 and 2012, several skyscrapers were built between 1990 and 2000, some skyscrapers were built earlier.

Gallery

Tallest buildings 

Tallest under construction - approved and proposed

External links 

 Report for Valencia at Emporis
 Report for Valencia  at SkyscraperPage
 Report for Valencia at Structurae

Valencia